Narzym railway station is a railway station serving the village of Narzym, in the Warmian-Masurian Voivodeship, Poland. The station opened in 1906 and is located on the Warsaw–Gdańsk railway and the train services are operated by Koleje Mazowieckie.

Train services
The station is served by the following service(s):

Regional services (R90/RE90) Dzialdowo - Mlawa - Nasielsk - Modlin - Legionowo - Warsaw

References

Station article at kolej.one.pl
 This article is based upon a translation of the Polish language version as of October 2016.

Railway stations in Warmian-Masurian Voivodeship
Działdowo County
Railway stations in Poland opened in 1906